"Vocal" is a song by English synth-pop duo Pet Shop Boys from their twelfth studio album, Electric (2013). It was released on 3 June 2013 as the album's second single.

Background
"Vocal" was written during the writing process for the 2012 album Elysium, and was one of the earliest tracks written for the album. The track, however, was not included on the record as it did not fit the rest of the "somber" and "reflective" material. It was instead recorded for Electric and was released as the album's second single. A demo version of "Vocal" was included as bonus track on the 2017 re-issue of Elysium.

Release
The single was released digitally on 3 June 2013. On 29 July 2013, "Vocal" was released on CD single and digital bundle formats, both containing the original album version and eight original remixes. The 12-inch vinyl single was released on 9 December 2013. It was the very first physical single release by Pet Shop Boys that did not contain any new B-side songs.

Music video
The music video for "Vocal" was directed by Joost Vandebrug. It is a tribute to rave culture and electronic music. It consists of a compilation of various amateur videos recorded circa the Summer of Rave in 1989.

Live performances
The song was performed as the final encore on the Electric Tour.

Other performances
In the 2015 revival of Pet Shop Boys stage musical Closer to Heaven at London's Union Theatre, "Vocal" replaced the original closing number "Positive Role Model".

Track listings

Charts

Weekly charts

Year-end charts

References

External links

2013 singles
2013 songs
Pet Shop Boys songs
Song recordings produced by Stuart Price
Songs written by Chris Lowe
Songs written by Neil Tennant